Cucujoidea is a superfamily of beetles. This group formerly included all of the families now included in the superfamily Coccinelloidea. They include some fungus beetles and a diversity of lineages of "bark beetles" unrelated to the "true" bark beetles (Scolytinae), which are weevils (superfamily Curculionoidea).

Morphology 
The morphology of Cucujoidea is varied and there are no features uniting all members of the superfamily.

Adults can be recognised by the procoxal cavities being internally open in most taxa, females having tarsal formula 5-5-5 and males 5-5-5 or 5-5-4 (rarely 4-4-4), females with tergite VIII concealed dorsally by tergite VII, and males with tergite X completely membraneous.

Larvae have frontal arms usually lyriform, the mandible mesal surface usually with well-developed mola, a maxillary articulating area usually present, a hypopharyngeal sclerome usually present, and two pretarsal setae.

Taxonomy
According to a 2015 revision, the following 25 families make up superfamily Cucujoidea:
 Agapythidae Sen Gupta and Crowson, 1969
 Boganiidae Sen Gupta & Crowson, 1966
 Cavognathidae Sen Gupta & Crowson, 1966
 Cryptophagidae Kirby, 1826 – silken fungus beetles
 Cucujidae Latreille, 1802 – flat bark beetles
 Cybocephalidae Jacquelin du Val, 1858
 Cyclaxyridae Gimmel, Leschen & Ślipiński, 2009 – sooty mould beetles
 Erotylidae Latreille, 1802 – pleasing fungus beetles
 Helotidae Reitter, 1876
 Hobartiidae Sen Gupta & Crowson, 1966
 Kateretidae Erichson in Agassiz, 1846 – short-winged flower beetles (= Brachypteridae)
 Laemophloeidae Ganglbauer 1899 – lined flat bark beetles
 Lamingtoniidae Sen Gupta & Crowson, 1966
 Monotomidae Laporte, 1840 – root-eating beetles
 Myraboliidae Lawrence and Britton, 1991
 Nitidulidae Latreille, 1802 – sap beetles
 Passandridae Erichson, 1845 – parasitic flat bark beetles
 Phalacridae Leach, 1815 – shining flower beetles
 Phloeostichidae Reitter, 1911
 Priasilphidae Crowson, 1973
 Protocucujidae Crowson, 1954
 Silvanidae Kirby, 1937 – silvanid flat bark beetles
 Smicripidae Horn, 1879 – palmetto beetles
 Sphindidae Jacquelin du Val, 1860 – dry-fungus beetles
 Tasmosalpingidae Lawrence and Britton, 1991
 Parandrexidae Kirejtshuk, 1994 (Middle Jurassic-Early Cretaceous)

Extinct genera 

 Alloterocucus Li et al., 2022 Burmese amber, Myanmar, mid-Cretaceous (latest Albian- earliest Cenomanian)

References

External links

 
Beetle superfamilies
Taxa named by Pierre André Latreille